Merv Mosely (born October 31, 1966) is a former American football player who played four seasons in the Arena Football League with the Albany Firebirds and Connecticut Coyotes. He played college football at Western Connecticut State University.

References

External links
Just Sports Stats

Living people
1966 births
Players of American football from Connecticut
American football wide receivers
American football defensive backs
African-American players of American football
Western Connecticut State Colonials football players
Albany Firebirds players
Connecticut Coyotes players
People from Groton, Connecticut
21st-century African-American people
20th-century African-American sportspeople